Kemar Anderson Brathwaite (born 29 September 1993) is a Barbadian cricketer who has represented the Barbados national team in West Indian domestic cricket. A right-handed opening batsman, he made his first-class debut in November 2015, playing against Guyana in the 2015–16 Regional Four Day Competition. In the following match, against the Windward Islands, Brathwaite narrowly missed out on a maiden half-century, scoring 46 in the first innings before being bowled by Shane Shillingford.

References

External links
Player profile and statistics at ESPNcricinfo

1993 births
Living people
Barbadian cricketers
Barbados cricketers